In mathematics, the Ravenel conjectures are a set of mathematical conjectures in the field of stable homotopy theory posed by Douglas Ravenel at the end of a paper published in 1984. It was earlier circulated in preprint. The problems involved have largely been resolved, with all but the "telescope conjecture" being proved in later papers by others. The telescope conjecture is now generally believed not to be true, though there are some conflicting claims concerning it in the published literature, and is taken to be an open problem. Ravenel's conjectures exerted influence on the field through the founding of the approach of chromatic homotopy theory.

The first of the seven conjectures, then the nilpotence conjecture, is now the nilpotence theorem. The telescope conjecture, which was #4 on the original list, remains of substantial interest because of its connection with the convergence of an Adams–Novikov spectral sequence. While opinion is against the truth of the original statement, investigations of associated phenomena (for a triangulated category in general) have become a research area in its own right.

References

Homotopy theory
Conjectures